Riga State Gymnasium No.1, the oldest school in the Baltic states, offers secondary education (grades 7 to 12) in Riga, the capital of Latvia.

The school traces its origins to school of Riga Cathedral, which was founded in 1211, a decade after the foundation of Riga itself. Its name and language of instruction have changed several times during its history. Latvian became the main language of instruction in 1919.

Today, the gymnasium is known for its strong programs in the natural sciences, mathematics and computer science. Students wishing to enroll at the school take an admissions test in mathematics. Its admissions rate, with as many as nine candidates competing for each position, is one of the lowest in the country. Since 1997 the school enrolls 30 to 40 people in its International Baccalaureate Diploma Programme each year, where instruction is offered in English. It was the first school in the Baltic states to offer the IBO Diploma Programme.
Each year a number of 12th grade students finish the DSD (Das Deutsches Sprachdiplom) programme by taking an exam along with the regular school leaving exams. Passing the exam enables them to pursue their higher education in German speaking countries.

Riga State Gymnasium No.1 is consistently ranked first among the schools in Latvia. 
Its students' average results on school leaving (state) exams are the highest in the country. 
Riga State Gymnasium No.1 is also the best school in Latvia based on its students' achievements at various domestic and international academic competitions.

Many of the graduates continue their education at highly ranked universities abroad, particularly in the UK, the Netherlands, Denmark, Germany, Austria, Switzerland and the USA. The percentage of these students is very high among the ones who graduate from the IBO Diploma Programme.

Notable alumni 
Agnis Andžāns – Latvian mathematician
Ingus Baušķenieks – Latvian musician
Gunārs Birkerts – Latvian American architect
Uldis Cērps – Chairman of the Financial and Capital Market Commission in Latvia
Tomass Dukurs – Latvian skeleton racer
Indulis Emsis – Latvian politician, former Prime Minister of Latvia
Andrejs Ērglis – Latvian cardiologist
Ingvars Vitenburgs – First Latvian to win three medals in three years at International Physics Olympiad
Māris Gailis – Latvian businessman, former Prime Minister of Latvia
Ivars Godmanis – Latvian politician, former Prime Minister of Latvia
Garlieb Merkel – Baltic German writer and activist
Wilhelm Ostwald – Baltic German Nobel Prize winning chemist
Friedrich Parrot – Baltic German naturalist and traveler
Kristjan Jaak Peterson – Estonian poet, commonly regarded as the founder of modern Estonian poetry
Mārtiņš Pļaviņš – Latvian beach volleyball player, 2012 Olympic medalist
Krista Puisite – First Latvian golfer to earn LPGA Tour Card
Māris Purgailis – Latvian politician, former Mayor of Riga
Rainis – Latvian poet and politician
Einars Repše – Latvian politician, former Prime Minister of Latvia
Pēteris Stučka – Latvian politician, head of the Bolshevik government in Latvia during the Latvian War of Independence
Daina Taimiņa – Latvian mathematician
Justs Sirmais – Latvian representative to the Eurovision Song Contest 2016.

See also
 List of the oldest schools in the world

References

External links 
Riga State Gymnasium No.1 – Official site
 – Deutsches Sprachdiplom

Educational institutions established in the 13th century
1211 establishments in Europe
International Baccalaureate schools in Latvia
Schools in Latvia
Education in Riga